Faut is a surname. Notable people with the surname include:

Corinne Faut (born 1960), Belgian general
Jean Faut (1925–2023), starting pitcher who played from 1946 through 1953
Volly De Faut (1904–1973), American jazz reed player

See also
K. D. Matanzima Airport (IATA: UTT, ICAO: FAUT)
Comme il faut, international tobacco company based in, Port-au-Prince, Haiti
Il faut du temps, album by the singer Dalida
Il faut du temps (je me battrai pour ça), the French entry in the Eurovision Song Contest 2002, performed in French by Sandrine François
Il nous faut" is a song performed by Belgian singer-songwriter Tom Dice and French singer Elisa Tovati